Dorche is a small river of Brandenburg, Germany. In Neuzelle it flows into the Klosterteich pond, which is drained by a small canal leading to the Oder–Spree Canal.

See also
List of rivers of Brandenburg

Rivers of Brandenburg
Rivers of Germany